The 1962 Motocross World Championship was the 6th edition of the Motocross World Championship organized by the FIM and reserved for 500cc and 250cc motorcycles.

Summary
The Husqvarna team's Rolf Tibblin won five Grand Prix races en route to claiming the first 500cc motocross world championship of his career. Swedish competitors dominated the championship with Swedes taking the top five places in the championship. Husqvarna also triumphed in the new 250cc motocross world championship with Torsten Hallman winning his first world title ahead of BSA teammates Jeff Smith and Arthur Lampkin.

Grands Prix

500cc

250cc

Final standings

Points are awarded to the top 6 classified finishers.

500cc

A FIM Jury rule that Tibblin and Johansson should be awarded 7 points each by combining first and second place points then dividing by two. 8+6= 14 ; 14/2 = 7 points.

250cc

Notes

References

Motocross World Championship seasons
Motocross World Championship